Pierre-Maurice Quays, Quay or Quaï (5 January 1777, Paris - 5 September 1803, Saint-Leu-La-Forêt) was a French Neoclassical painter, notable for his invention of the term 'Rococo'.

References

1779 births
1802 deaths
18th-century French painters
French male painters
19th-century French painters
19th-century French male artists
18th-century French male artists